Alf Kristian Opheim (28 April 1920 – 26 July 2006) was a Norwegian alpine skier. He was born in Bergen. He participated at the 1952 Winter Olympics in Oslo, where he competed in giant slalom.

He became Norwegian champion in alpine combined in 1950, and in both slalom and downhill in 1952.

References

1920 births
2006 deaths
Norwegian male alpine skiers
Olympic alpine skiers of Norway
Alpine skiers at the 1948 Winter Olympics
Alpine skiers at the 1952 Winter Olympics
Sportspeople from Bergen